Dennis Linthicum is an American Republican politician currently serving in the Oregon Senate.

Early Life
Linthicum, originally from California, attended Biola University, a private, evangelical Christian university in La Mirada, California.

Career
Linthicum graduated with a bachelors in economics from University of California, Los Angeles in 1978, and received his master's degree in Christian Apologetics from Biola University in 2009.
 He began a software developer career in California, working of Hughes Aircraft. Later, he was the senior vice president of management information systems at Lange Financial and again at Pacific Mutual Life Insurance.

Linthicum, who is a supporter of the Tea Party movement, was elected to the Senate in 2016 to replace the retiring Doug Whitsett. The 28th district covers parts of south-central Oregon.

He was elected as a Klamath County Commissioner in 2008. In 2013, he was involved in a recall petition to remove all of the commissioners. The reason for the recall, according to the filed petition was, "Commissioner Dennis Linthicum has failed to listen to constituents of Klamath County on issues vital to our economy and to the benefit of our citizens. Examples are; lack of support for the county trapper, the Meals on Wheels [program] for our senior citizens, funding for our Sheriff's Department, water issues for the Klamath Basin, etc."Linthicum ran for the United States House of Representatives in 2014, losing in the Republican primary to incumbent Greg Walden.

Linthicum and E. Werner Rescke, who also took office the same year as a State Representative, were the center of what was later called the "Whitsett Maneuver". Several pieces of legislation were introduced to change the candidate filing deadlines for future elections, but none of them passed.

From June 20, 2019, all 11 Republican state senators for Oregon, including Linthicum, refused to show up for work at the Oregon State Capitol, instead going into hiding, some even fleeing the state. Their aim was to prevent a vote on a cap-and-trade proposal that would dramatically lower greenhouse gas emissions by 2050 to combat climate change. The Senate holds 30 seats, but 1 is vacant due to a death. Without the Republican senators, the remaining 18 Democratic state senators could not reach a quorum of 20 to hold a vote. Although several Republican state senators returned to the Senate chamber on June 29, 2019, leading to the cap-and-trade bill being sent back to committee, while other bills were passed, Linthicum was missing, and it was stated that he would not return for the month's legislative session.

On December 11, 2020, Linthicum and 11 other state Republican officials signed a letter requesting Oregon Attorney General Ellen Rosenblum join Texas and other states contesting the results of the 2020 presidential election in Texas v. Pennsylvania. Rosenblum announced she had filed in behalf of the defense, and against Texas, the day prior.

Linthicum was elected treasurer of the Oregon Republican Party in February 2021 as part of a conservative insurgent slate that also elected Sen. Dallas Heard, R-Roseburg, as chairman and former Sen. Herman Baertschiger, Jr., R-Grants Pass, as vice chair.

In October 2021, Linthicum signed a letter along with other Republican politicians from around the nation calling for an audit of the 2020 election in all states and the elimination of voter rolls in every state. The letter also claimed that the Arizona audit found evidence of fraud.

Senator Linthicum, a supporter of the organization Stand for Health Freedom, contacted Oregon's attorney general in late 2021 and requested that he initiate a DOJ investigation into alleged mishandling of COVID-19 data by the CDC, as admitted to by director Rochelle Walensky herself.  The Senator further supported the filing of a civil rights lawsuit against Walensky and colleagues to make COVID-19 data public in the federal Ninth Circuit Court in March 2022, with the aim of determining whether the true COVID-related death count actually supported assertions of a full-blown pandemic and hence the vaccine EUA.

Linthicum sponsored the Greater Idaho bill in the Oregon Senate on January 10, 2023, which would move the border between Idaho and Oregon to follow the Cascade Range. This would make 15 counties currently in Eastern Oregon part of Idaho.

Personal life
Linthicum and his wife, Diane, have two children. He attends Bonanza Community Church.

References

External links
 Campaign website
 Legislative website

1950s births
Place of birth missing (living people)
Republican Party Oregon state senators
University of California, Los Angeles alumni
Biola University alumni
People from Klamath County, Oregon
Living people
County commissioners in Oregon